Cordylecladia is a genus of red algae belonging to the family Rhodymeniaceae.

The species of this genus are found in Europe, Northern America and Australia.

Species:

Cordylecladia andersonii 
Cordylecladia erecta 
Cordylecladia guiryi

References

Florideophyceae
Red algae genera